Observatory railway station is a Metrorail station serving the suburb of Observatory in Cape Town. It is served by trains on the Southern Line.

The station is located under the Station Road bridge. It has two tracks served by two side platforms, connected by pedestrian subways.

Notable places nearby
 Groote Schuur Hospital and the University of Cape Town Medical School
 South African Astronomical Observatory headquarters
 Hartleyvale Stadium
 Parish Church of St Michael and All Angels

Railway stations in Cape Town
Metrorail Western Cape stations

Observatory, Cape Town